James William Milne (19 September 1898 – 26 June 1961) was an Australian rules footballer who played with St Kilda in the Victorian Football League (VFL).

He represented the state of Victoria twice.

After leaving St. Kilda he went on to play for South Warrnambool, Coburg and Moe. He was known for his kicking skills.

Notes

External links 

1898 births
1961 deaths
Australian rules footballers from Victoria (Australia)
St Kilda Football Club players
South Warrnambool Football Club players